"How Much Land Does a Man Require?" (Russian: Много ли человеку земли нужно?, Mnogo li cheloveku zemli nuzhno?) is an 1886 short story by Leo Tolstoy about a man who, in his lust for land, forfeits everything.

Synopsis
The protagonist of the story is a peasant named Pahom, who overhears his wife and sister-in-law argue over the merits of town and peasant farm life. He thinks to himself "if I had plenty of land, I shouldn't fear the Devil himself!". Unbeknown to him, Satan is listening.

However, Pahom then becomes very possessive of his land, and this causes arguments with his neighbors. "Threats to burn his building began to be uttered." Later, he moves to a larger area of land at another Commune. Here, he can grow even more crops and amass a small fortune, but he has to grow the crops on rented land, which irritates him.
Finally, after buying and selling a lot of fertile and good land, he is introduced to the Bashkirs, and is told that they are simple-minded people who own a huge amount of land. Pahom goes to them to buy as much of their land for as low a price as he can negotiate. Their offer is very unusual: for a sum of one thousand rubles, Pahom can walk around as large an area as he wants, starting at daybreak, marking his route with a spade along the way. If he returns to his starting point by sunset that day, all the land his route encloses will be his, but if he does not reach his starting point, he will lose his money and receive no land. He is delighted, as he believes that he can cover a great distance and has chanced upon the bargain of a lifetime. That night, Pahom experiences a surreal dream in which he sees himself lying dead by the feet of the Devil, who is laughing.

He stays out as late as possible, marking out land until just before the sun sets. Toward the end, he realizes he is far from the starting point and runs back as fast as he can to the waiting Bashkirs. He finally arrives at the starting point just as the sun sets. The Bashkirs cheer his good fortune, but exhausted from the run, Pahom drops dead. His servant buries him in an ordinary grave only six feet long, thus answering the question posed in the title of the story.

Cultural influence

Late in life, James Joyce wrote to his daughter that it is "the greatest story that the literature of the world knows"; Ludwig Wittgenstein was another well-known admirer. Motifs from the short story are used in the 1969 West German film Scarabea: How Much Land Does a Man Need? directed by Hans-Jürgen Syberberg. The story was adapted into a graphic novel by Martin Veyron. "Zameen" an episode from the 1986 Indian anthology series Katha Sagar was adapted from the story.

See also
Bibliography of Leo Tolstoy
Twenty-Three Tales

External links 
 Complete Text, as translated by Louise Maude and Aylmer Maude
 "How Much Land Does a Man Need?", from RevoltLib.com
 [https://www.marxists.org/archive/tolstoy/1886/how-much-land-does-a-man-need.html "How Much Land Does a Man Need?"], from Marxists.org

Other Versions

 - a collection including How Much Land Does a Man Need?''

References 

1886 short stories
Bashkortostan
Parables
Short stories adapted into films
Short stories by Leo Tolstoy